Apenta is a still and sparkling Hungarian aperient water. Its principal constituents are sulphates of magnesia and soda.
The water's source were the Uj Hunyadi springs in Buda.

See also
 Mineral water

References

https://timesmachine.nytimes.com/timesmachine/1896/06/14/503185562.pdf

Bottled water brands